Methoxyketamine or 2-MeO-2-deschloroketamine is a designer drug of the arylcyclohexylamine class first reported in 1963. It is an analog of ketamine in which the chlorine atom has been replaced with a methoxy group.  Its synthesis by rearrangement of an amino ketone has been reported. As an arylcyclohexylamine, methoxyketamine most likely functions as an NMDA receptor antagonist. It produces sedative, hallucinogenic, and (at high doses) anesthetic effects, but with a lower potency than ketamine itself.

See also
 2-Fluorodeschloroketamine
 Bromoketamine
 Methoxmetamine
 Trifluoromethyldeschloroketamine

References

Arylcyclohexylamines
Designer drugs
Dissociative drugs
Ketones
Phenol ethers